
Gmina Radomyśl nad Sanem is a rural gmina (administrative district) in Stalowa Wola County, Subcarpathian Voivodeship, in south-eastern Poland.

Villages
Gmina Radomyśl nad Sanem contains the villages and settlements of Antoniów, Chwałowice, Czekaj Pniowski, Dąbrowa Rzeczycka, Dąbrówka Pniowska, Kępa Rzeczycka, Łążek Chwałowicki, Musików, Nowiny, Orzechów, Ostrówek, Pniów, Radomyśl nad Sanem, Rzeczyca Długa, Rzeczyca Okrągła, Witkowice, Wola Rzeczycka, Żabno and Zalesie.

Neighbouring gminas
Gmina Radomyśl nad Sanem is bordered by the gminas of Annopol, Dwikozy, Gorzyce, Gościeradów, Pysznica, Zaklików, Zaleszany and Zawichost.

References

Polish official population figures 2006

Radomysl nad Sanem
Stalowa Wola County